Aavasavyuham: The Arbit Documentation of An Amphibian Hunt also more commonly known as Aavasavyuham (transl. Habitat) is a 2022 Indian Malayalam-language, comedy-drama science fiction film written and directed by Krishand. The film stars Rahul Rajagopal, Sreenath Babu, Sreejith Babu, Zhinz Shan in the lead roles. The approach used to depict the storyline in the film was inspired from Warren Beatty's directorial Reds and Christopher Nolan's directorial Interstellar. The film was streamed via SonyLIV from 4 August 2022 as a LIV originals opening to positive reviews from critics. The film also won the Kerala State Film Award for Best Film in 2021 and Kerala State Film Award for Best Screenplay in 2021. Film critic Anna M. M. Vetticad ranked it third in her year-end list of best Malayalam films of 2022.

Cast 

 Rahul Rajagopal
 Sreenath Babu
 Sreejith Babu
 Zhinz Shan

Production 
Filmmaker Krishand used social media platforms such as TikTok as one of the popular communication techniques to narrate the plot of the film. The mockumentary element was also used in the film by the filmmaker and Krishand drew inspiration from the comic book character Swamp Thing which featured in the 1954 film Creature from the Black Lagoon, and werewolf stories. The final chapter of the film was inspired by Franz Kafka’s The Metamorphosis as well as the Gabriel Garcia Marquez's A Very Old Man with Enormous Wings.

Awards and nominations

Notes

References

External links 

2022 films
2020s Malayalam-language films
2022 comedy-drama films
Indian comedy-drama films
Films shot in Kerala
Films not released in theaters due to the COVID-19 pandemic
Indian direct-to-video films
2022 direct-to-video films
Direct-to-video comedy-drama films
SonyLIV original films
Indian family films
Best Malayalam Feature Film National Film Award winners
Kerala State Film Award winners